James Nelson Pidcock (February 8, 1836 – December 17, 1899) was an American Democratic Party politician who represented  in the United States House of Representatives for two terms from 1885 to 1889.

He was a cousin of Alvah A. Clark, who represented the same district from 1877 to 1881.

Early life and career
Born in the Whitehouse Station section of Readington Township, New Jersey, Pidcock attended the district schools and Lebanon Grammar School, Lebanon, New Jersey.

He engaged in civil engineering 1850–1857, and engaged in agricultural pursuits and was also a dealer in livestock after 1857. He served as member of the New Jersey Senate from Hunterdon County, New Jersey from 1877 to 1880, and served as delegate to the Democratic National Conventions in 1884 and 1888.

Congress
Pidcock was elected as a Democrat to the Forty-ninth and Fiftieth Congresses, serving in office from March 4, 1885 – March 3, 1889, but was not a candidate for renomination in 1888.

Later career and death
After leaving Congress, he again resumed his agricultural pursuits.
He was involved in the construction of the Georgia Northern Railroad in southern Georgia, where he owned large timber tracts.

He served as president of the board of managers of the New Jersey State Hospital for the Insane 1891–1896.
He was an orchardist in New Jersey.

Death
He died at Whitehouse Station, New Jersey, on December 17, 1899.
He was interred in Elmwood Cemetery, Lebanon, New Jersey.

References

James Nelson Pidcock at The Political Graveyard

1836 births
1899 deaths
Democratic Party New Jersey state senators
People from Readington Township, New Jersey
Politicians from Hunterdon County, New Jersey
Democratic Party members of the United States House of Representatives from New Jersey
American orchardists
19th-century American politicians